Polish invasion of Czechoslovakia can refer to:
 The bloodless annexation of parts of modern Czech territory by Poland in 1938
 The Polish participation in the Warsaw Pact invasion of Czechoslovakia in 1968